York rite may refer to:

 the York Rite, one of the rites of Freemasonry
 the Use of York, an English Christian liturgical rite